Yamla Jat is a pre-partition Punjabi film directed by Moti B. Gidwani, released in 1940. It starred M. Ismail, Noor Jehan and Pran in lead roles. The music is composed by Ghulam Haider and lyrics written by Wali Sahib for playback singers Noor Jehan and others. A popular song from this film is: "kankaan diyaan fasalaan pakiyaan ne, badalaan vichon khushian vassiyaan ne".

Cast 
Cast from the Movie's 
 M.Esmail
 Noor Jehan
 Anjana
 Kuldip
 S. Paul
 Durga Khote 
 F.Shah
 M.Ajmal
 Pran

See also 
 Mangti

References

External links 
 

1940 films
Indian black-and-white films
Punjabi-language Indian films
Punjabi-language Pakistani films
1940s Punjabi-language films